Douglas ("Doug") Stuart Pirini (born 6 September 1969 in Auckland) is a retired decathlete from New Zealand, who represented his native country in the men's decathlon at the 1996 Summer Olympics in Atlanta, Georgia. There he ended up in 24th place, with a total number of 7961 points.

Pirini was also a member of the New Zealand team at the 1994 and 1998 Commonwealth Games, finishing in fourth (Victoria) and fifth place (Kuala Lumpur).

References
 New Zealand Olympic Committee

1969 births
Living people
New Zealand decathletes
Athletes (track and field) at the 1996 Summer Olympics
Athletes (track and field) at the 1994 Commonwealth Games
Athletes (track and field) at the 1998 Commonwealth Games
Olympic athletes of New Zealand
Athletes from Auckland
Commonwealth Games competitors for New Zealand